Temperance (XIV) is the fourteenth trump or Major Arcana card in most traditional Tarot decks. It is used in game playing as well as in divination.

Description 
Temperance appears in the oldest Italian decks where it is numbered VI or VII.  In the Tarot de Marseille and in most contemporary decks the card is numbered XIV. In the Thoth Tarot and decks influenced by it, this card is called Art rather than Temperance.

Temperance is almost invariably depicted as a person pouring liquid from one receptacle into another. Historically, this was a standard symbol of the virtue temperance, one of the cardinal virtues, representing the dilution of wine with water. In many decks, the person is a winged angel, usually female or androgynous, and stands with one foot on water and one foot on land.

At the end of the path in the lower left part of the card, there is a crown to show the attainment of a goal, or mastery thereof.

In the Rider–Waite image by Pamela Coleman-Smith (shown on this page) the Hebrew Tetragrammaton is on the angel's chest above the square and triangle. In the derivative Tarot decks this is usually not included.

According to A.E. Waite's 1910 book The Pictorial Key to the Tarot, the Temperance card is associated with:
14.TEMPERANCE.--Economy, moderation, frugality, management, accommodation. Reversed: Things connected with churches, religions, sects, the priesthood, sometimes even the priest who will marry Querent; also disunion, unfortunate combinations, competing interests.

References 

 A. E. Waite's 1910 Pictorial Key to the Tarot
 Hajo Banzhaf, Tarot and the Journey of the Hero (2000)
 Most works by Joseph Campbell
 G. Ronald Murphy, S.J., The Owl, The Raven, and The Dove: Religious Meaning of the Grimm's Magic Fairy Tales (2000)
Juliette Wood, Folklore 109 (1998):15-24, "The Celtic Tarot and the Secret Tradition: A Study in Modern Legend Making" (1998)

External links 

Major Arcana